Amman Kovil Kizhakale is a 1986 Indian Tamil-language romantic drama film written and directed by R. Sundarrajan, starring Vijayakanth and Radha. It was released on 24 April 1986, and emerged a commercial success. Vijayakanth also won the Filmfare Award for Best Actor – Tamil. It was remade into Telugu as Khaidi No. 786 (1988) and Kannada as Nammoora Hammera (1990).

Plot 
Chinnamani lives in a village along with his father and his friends. Chinnamani sings well and always performs during the village temple festivals. Kanmani is a wealthy girl, and the only daughter of the village panchayat board president, who is arrogant. Kanmani, who boasts of being rich enters into clashes with Chinnamani and she decides to take revenge on Chinnamani as Chinnamani does not respect her. She decides to learn music from Chinnamani and also pretends to love him and embarrasses him in front of everyone, which angers Chinnamani.She also breaks his Harmonium for which in anger, he breaks Kanmani's car. Kanmani beats Chinnamani with whip as it was decided by the panchayat for punishing Chinnamani. Angered, Chinnamani marries Kanmani by tying the thaali around her neck immediately without her consent. Kanmani's mother tells the truth to Kanmani about Chinnamani.

Actually Chinnamani is the son of Srividya's elder brother, who is a wealthy man. Ravichandran worked under Vinu Chakravarthy and Srividya loved him. But Ravichandran takes all the properties from Vinu Chakravarthy after marrying his sister and sends him out of town. Also, Kanmani is the daughter of Ravichandran's illegitimate relationship with their house maid and Sri Vidya raised her as her own daughter.

Hearing this, Kanmani realises her mistake and decides to live together with Chinnamani, but he does not believe her. Ravichandran decides to kill Chinnamani and sends a few thugs. Finally, Kanmani kills them and goes to jail. She returns after a few years where she finds Chinnamani as mentally disturbed person searching for Kanmani always. She unites with Chinnamani in the end.

Cast 
 Vijayakanth as Chinnamani
 Radha as Kanmani
 Ravichandran as Kanmani's father
 Srividya as Kanmani's mother
 Senthil as Kathavarayan
 Radha Ravi
 Vinu Chakravarthy
 Ra. Sankaran
 T. K. S. Chandran
 Suriyakanth
Nalinikanth

Production 
Sundarrajan initially planned to direct the film with Rajinikanth and later with Murali; however things did not work out. After the success of Vaidehi Kathirunthal (1984), he decided to cast Vijayakanth and Radha.

Soundtrack 
The music was composed by Ilaiyaraaja. All songs were massive hits. The song "Poova Eduthu" is set in Mayamalavagowla raga, the song "Kaalai Nera" set in Abhogi raga., all lyrics were written by Gangai Amaran

Reception 
Jayamanmathan of Kalki opined that although the film was dragging frequently, it could be watched to know what happens in the plot. Vijayakanth won the Filmfare Award for Best Actor – Tamil, the Cinema Express Award for Best Actor – Tamil, and the Pesum Padam Award for Best Actor.

References

External links 
 

1980s Tamil-language films
1986 films
1986 romantic drama films
Films directed by R. Sundarrajan
Films scored by Ilaiyaraaja
Indian romantic drama films
Tamil films remade in other languages